Gherardo Starnina (c. 1360–1413) was an Italian painter from Florence in the Quattrocento era.

According to the biographer Giorgio Vasari, Starnina initially trained with Antonio Veneziano, then with Agnolo Gaddi. He is claimed to have participated in the painting of the frescos in the Castellani Chapel in Basilica di Santa Croce, Florence. He is also said to have moved to Spain in 1380 to work under Juan I of Castile, and is attributed some painting in the San Blas chapel of the Cathedral of Toledo.

Several paintings formerly attributed to the Master of the Bambino Vispo are now attributed to Gherardo Starnina, and the two artists may have been the same person.

References

External links

See also
 List of Italian painters

1413 deaths
15th-century Italian painters
Painters from Florence
Gothic painters
Quattrocento painters
Italian male painters
Year of birth unknown
Year of birth uncertain